The Shot Tower at Taroona is a heritage listed historic building between Hobart and Kingston, Tasmania. It was the tallest building in Australia for four years (1870-1875), and the tallest structure in Tasmania until it was superseded by the Mount Wellington broadcast tower in 1960. The Taroona Shot Tower is believed to be the tallest circular sandstone tower in the world.

History

Joseph Moir a Scotsman skilled in iron-mongering, moved to Hobart in 1829 and bought several parcels of land across the state. Designed and built by Moir in only eight months, the Taroona Shot Tower became the tallest building in Australia when it was completed in 1870. An inscription at the tower proclaims that the first shot was dropped on the 8th September, 1870.

The residence of Joseph Moir and his family for many years was located at Queensborough Glen Estate, which is located on the grounds of the historic Shot Tower.

The shot business was protected by a tariff until the Federation of Australia, but after 1901 then-operator William Baynton could not compete with other shotmakers in Australia, and the business ceased operations in 1905. Baynton's wife ran a tea shop at the base of the tower, marking the beginning of the Tower’s use for tourism. The Shot Tower, surrounding land and buildings were made into Scenery Reserve by the Tasmanian Government in 1956. Since then, the building has been converted into a historic site and is open to tourism. Remaining as it was operated by Mrs Baynton, the tea room is open in the buildings at the base of the Tower.

Operation method
The Taroona Shot Tower used the "long drop and water" method. Lead ingots laced with arsenic and antimony were hauled to the top of the tower, where they were melted. The liquid was then poured down the centre of the tower through a colander, which separated it into drops. Once in free-fall, these drops formed naturally into spheres. They instantly solidified upon hitting a pool of water at the bottom of the tower.

Height

Legacy
The Taroona Shot Tower was the tallest building in the country for 4 years, and is one of only three remaining shot towers in Australia, with the others being the Clifton Hill Shot Tower and Coop's Shot Tower located within the Melbourne Central Shopping Centre.
It is the sole claimant for the tallest and first circular sandstone shot tower in the Southern Hemisphere and the only one still open for visitors to enter and climb.
The building is listed on the Tasmanian Heritage Register and was listed on the now defunct  Register of the National Estate.

The Shot Tower is the emblem for Taroona Primary School.

Travel
The Shot Tower is accessible from the Hobart City Centre via car or metro bus along the Channel Highway.

References

Taroona, Tasmania
Buildings and structures in Tasmania
Towers completed in 1870
Shot towers
Tasmanian Heritage Register
Towers in Australia
Tasmanian places listed on the defunct Register of the National Estate